The Tour de Bravone or Tour de Bravona was a Genoese tower located in the commune of Linguizzetta on the east coast of Corsica. Only a few traces survive.

The tower was built in the second half of the 16th century. It was one of a series of coastal defences constructed by the Republic of Genoa between 1530 and 1620 to stem the attacks by Barbary pirates.

References

Towers in Corsica
Buildings and structures in Haute-Corse